George Mason II (1660–1716) was an early American planter and officeholder who, although his father's only child, had many children and thus can be said to have established the Mason family as one of the First Families of Virginia. His grandson George Mason IV  became the most distinguished member of the family, a Founding Father of the United States.

Early life
Mason was born in 1660 at his father's Accokeek plantation in Stafford County, Virginia. He was the only son of George Mason I and his first wife Mary French. He was the first of Virginia's Mason family to be born in British America.

Political career
Like his father, Mason led the Stafford County militia, with the rank of colonel. After his father's death, he won election many times as one of Stafford County's two part-time delegates in the House of Burgesses (then the only house of the Virginia General Assembly).  This George Mason also served as  the county's sheriff and justice of the peace between 1699 and 1700. During this tenure Mason secured funds from the county to build what was probably Stafford's first jail in 1690. Also between 1699 and 1700, Mason was county lieutenant of Stafford County, under General Nicholson, and defended white settlers of the Potomac region against Native Americans.

Business ventures
In 1691, the town of Marlborough was laid out on the same neck of land in the Potomac River that included Accokeek plantation. Mason received multiple lots in Marlborough and may have built a tavern there.

Mason sold Accokeek after his father's death and relocated to a plantation on Chopawamsic Creek which he named Chopawamsic. At Chopawamsic, Mason planted an orchard, grew tobacco, and raised sheep and cattle.

Marriage and children
Mason married his cousin Mary Fowke, daughter of Gerard Fowke and Ann Thorogood, in 1688. The couple had the following children:

Ann Fowke Mason Fitzhugh Darrell Smith
Elizabeth Mason Roy
George Mason III (1690–March 5, 1735)
Nicholson Mason (1694–1715 or 1716)
French Mason (1695–1748)
Mary Mason Fitzhugh Strother (born circa 1700)
Simpha Rosa Ann Field Mason Dinwiddie Bronaugh (1703–November 22, 1761)

Mason married secondly to Elizabeth Waugh in Stafford County, Virginia in 1706. George and Elizabeth had one daughter:

Catherine Mason (June 21, 1707–June 15, 1750)

Mason married for a third time to Sarah Taliaferro, daughter of Francis Taliaferro and Elizabeth Catlett, in 1710. George and Sarah had four children:

Gerard Mason
Thomas Mason
Francis Mason (born 1711)
Sarah Mason (born 1715)

Later life
Mason died in 1716 in Port Tobacco, Charles County, Maryland. He was interred on a hillside with his father near the site of the old Accokeek estate near Accokeek Creek in Stafford County, Virginia.

References

1660 births
1716 deaths
American people of English descent
American planters
American slave owners
British North American Anglicans
House of Burgesses members
Mason family
People from Stafford County, Virginia
Virginia sheriffs
Taliaferro family of Virginia